Oude Kerk (Dutch: "Old Church") may refer to:

 Oude Kerk (Amsterdam)
 Oude Kerk (Delft)

See also
 Old Church (disambiguation)